Jocelyn Henríquez de King is a Venezuelan diplomat who served as the ambassador of Venezuela to India, concurrent with Bangladesh, Nepal and Sri Lanka, between 1993 and 1998. She also served as the Venezuelan ambassador to China.

References 

Women ambassadors
Ambassadors of Venezuela to China
Ambassadors of Venezuela to India
Possibly living people
Year of birth missing
Ambassadors of Venezuela to Bangladesh
Ambassadors of Venezuela to Nepal
Ambassadors of Venezuela to Sri Lanka